Eimskipafélag Íslands hf. is an international shipping company with 55 offices in 20 countries and four continents; Europe, North America, South America and Asia. Eimskip specializes in worldwide freight forwarding services with focus on frozen and chilled commodities. The company also operates a powerful freight network in Iceland under the name Flytjandi and its subsidiary Sæferðir, which operates the passenger transport ferries Baldur and Særún.

Eimskip was founded on January 17, 1914, with the issue of shares where many Icelanders became founding members and the company was called "the favourite child of the nation", in Icelandic "óskabarn þjóðarinnar".

Eimskip operates 17 vessels and received its newest and most environmentally friendly vessels in 2020, Dettifoss and Brúarfoss, which sail in collaboration with the Greenlandic shipping company Royal Artic Line between Iceland, Greenland, the Faroe Islands and Scandinavia.

Eimskips also operates 42 warehouses and cold storages in North-America, Europe and Asia. And was once the biggest owner of cold storages in the world with over 180 cold storages on five continents.

History
Eimskipafélag Íslands was founded in 1914 the with issuance of public shares where around 14,000 people bought shares or at that time 15% of the Icelandic population. The first chairman of the board was Sveinn Björnsson, later the first president of Iceland.

Executives
 Vilhelm Már Þorsteinsson, Eimskip CEO
 Egill Örn Petersen, Eimskip CFO / Finance
 Hilmar Pétur Valgarðsson, Eimskip COO / Operations
 Hilmar Karlsson, Eimskip CIO / IT
 Edda Rut Björnsdóttir, Eimskip Executive Vice President / Human Resources and Communication
 Bragi Þór Marinósson, Eimskip Executive Vice President / International Operations
 Björn Einarsson, Eimskip Vice President / Sales and Business Management
 Guðmundur Nikulásson, Eimskip Vice President / Iceland Domestic Operations and Services
 Davíð Ingi Jónsson, Eimskip General Councel and Compliance Officer

Board of directors
 Baldvin Þorsteinsson, Chairman of the board
 Lárus L. Blöndal, Vice-Chairman of the Board
 Guðrún Ó. Blöndal, Board Member
 Margrét Guðmundsdóttir, Board Member
 Ólöf Hildur Pálsdóttir, Board member

References

Further reading 

 Company history – Eimskip.com

External links
Eimskipafélag Íslands, official website

Container shipping companies
Companies based in Reykjavík
Transport companies established in 1914
Shipping companies of Iceland
1914 establishments in Iceland